Anestis Argyriou (born 4 January 1988) is a Greek professional footballer who plays as a right-back.

Club career

Aetos Skydra
Argyriou began his career with Aetos Skydra (was on loan from Veria F.C.) in Delta Ethniki. In Skydra he performed admirably and was tipped as a hot prospect.

Panthrakikos
After many good performances in 2007 Argyriou signed for Super League team Panthrakikos being deployed as a right fullback or central defender. In April 2010 he had a successful week's trial in Blackburn.

AEK Athens
On 11 May 2010 Argyriou agreed to sign for AEK Athens along with a teammate at his previous club Panthrakikos, Spyros Matentzidis. He scored his first goal in a friendly match against Hapoel Be'er Sheva F.C. in a 1–0 victory for AEK Athens. He made his first appearance in the Greek Super League against Panathinaikos. In July 2012 Argyriou's contract was terminated by AEK to pay off club debts.

Rangers
On 12 August 2012, Argyriou joined Rangers on trial and later signed a two-year contract with the club on 25 August 2012. He made his debut in a 1–1 draw against Berwick Rangers on 26 August. On 18 September 2013 Rangers announced that defender Anestis Argyriou had mutually agreed to terminate his contract.

Zawisza Bydgoszcz
On 22 July 2014, Argyriou joined Polish side Zawisza Bydgoszcz on five-day-long trial. On 31 July he signed a two-year contract with the club. Argyriou made his Ekstraklasa debut on 10 August in home match against Podbeskidzie Bielsko-Biała (1–2).

International career
Argyriou, during 2008–10 period participated for the Greece U-21 team in seven games:

Career statistics

Honours
Rangers
Scottish Third Division: 2013

Notes

References

External links

1988 births
Living people
Greek footballers
Greece under-21 international footballers
Association football defenders
Panthrakikos F.C. players
AEK Athens F.C. players
Rangers F.C. players
Ethnikos Achna FC players
Super League Greece players
Cypriot First Division players
Scottish Football League players
Greek expatriate footballers
Expatriate footballers in Scotland
People from Imathia
Footballers from Central Macedonia